Michael Harrison Sweet (born July 4, 1963) is a singer and guitarist from Whittier, California; he is the co-founder, songwriter, guitarist and lead singer of the Christian metal band Stryper. He's also had a successful solo career, and briefly served as singer and guitarist for Boston from 2007 to 2011.

Stryper

In the early 1980s, Sweet and his brother started a band called Roxx Regime and played in small venues. They were a trio for a period of time with Sweet being the only guitar player in the band. This band would later become Stryper. The band challenged the stereotype of heavy metal being satanic and took Christian rock into mainstream.

With the band, Sweet was not only the lead vocalist and shared lead guitar duties, but he also wrote most of the music for the band as well as co-producing and arranging the music. The band recorded five successful studio albums. The band's reputation declined in the 1990s.

Solo
After nine years as the lead singer/lead guitarist of Stryper, Sweet left the band in 1992 in order to pursue a solo career. He first released a demo album, Unstryped, which featured several songs allegedly intended for the band. Sweet later included some of these on his first full-length album.

His self-titled debut album was released in 1994 and sold over 250,000 copies. He followed it with a slightly softer album titled Real in 1996 earning him a Dove Award nomination. Soon after the release of Real, Sweet left Benson Records, with whom he had released the two albums.

During this time, Sweet and his wife Kyle moved to Massachusetts, where Sweet worked at his father-in-law's campground/cranberry business, Maple Park. In 1998, he released an independent demo album titled Truth which received critical acclaim. He was signed to Restless Records and re-released Truth in 2000 with a new song-list and new artwork.

On August 19, 2007, Sweet was asked by Boston's Tom Scholz to be one of the lead singers and guitarists for Come Together: A Tribute to the Life of Brad Delp at the Bank of America Pavilion in Boston. Scholz then asked Sweet to join Boston for the band's summer 2008 tour with Styx as the opening act.

Boston

Sweet performed lead vocals, background vocals, and guitar work for Boston. Sweet was asked to be a part of what was supposed to be Boston's last performance on August 19, 2007. It was a benefit and tribute show and names such as Sammy Hagar, Mickey Thomas and Ann Wilson were among the invited guests. Tom Scholz was moved by what Sweet had written about the late Brad Delp and then heard Sweet sing and play guitar. Scholz was so impressed with Sweet's talents that he invited him to join the band and become a permanent member. Boston began booking a tour for 2008 with Styx as the opening act. Sweet handled lead vocals on roughly half of the set list and played guitar for the entire set and handled solo work as well. In August 2011, it was announced that Sweet had left Boston to focus on his priorities and contributions to Stryper.

Stryper reunion

In 1999, Sweet reunited with former Stryper bandmates Oz Fox and Tim Gaines during a concert in Puerto Rico. The concert featured Fox and Gaines's band, SinDizzy. Sweet was invited as a solo artist. The three of them got together for a set of four songs. The next year, the first Stryper Expo was held in New Jersey and the entire line-up was reunited again.

Although original bassist, Tim Gaines, left the group in 2005 and was replaced by Tracy Ferrie, the band has continued to work together, releasing a new album titled Reborn, produced by Sweet. However, he has continued with his solo career as well. In August 2006, he released a solo album titled Him which features traditional hymns re-written and arranged by Sweet. The band then released the album Murder by Pride, produced by Sweet in July 2009. Perry Richardson who is formerly of the band Firehouse is now the bassist for the band. Perry has brought a new life into the band and they are currently touring and planning a new studio album to be released in 2020.

In 2007, Sweet released an album called Touched in honor of his wife, Kyle, who died on March 5, 2009, after a two-year battle with ovarian cancer.

In September 2009, Stryper embarked on its 25th anniversary world tour, "Rocking the Hell Out of You for 25 years" with the original members. The tour included two opening bands: Manic Drive and Flight Patterns, the latter which includes Sweet's son, Michael Sweet, Jr.

On February 15, 2011, Stryper released a new record entitled The Covering, produced by Sweet.

In 2013, Stryper released two studio albums, Second Coming and No More Hell to Pay via Frontiers Records. They released a live album and DVD, Stryper: Live at the Whiskey, recorded in 2013 at the Whisky a Go Go on the Sunset Strip recorded from November 2013. Sweet has also worked with Lynch Mob founder and former Dokken member, George Lynch on recording an album, Only to Rise, released under the name Sweet & Lynch. Sweet discussed the group on Eddie Trunk Podcast dated February 4, 2015. The group also consists of former White Lion and former Megadeth member James LoMenzo on bass, and former Whitesnake and former Foreigner member Brian Tichy on drums. Only to Rise was released on January 27, 2015.

Aside from Stryper developing their new album, Fallen, Sweet has confirmed he has signed with Rat Pak Records to release a new solo album in early 2016, One Sided War.

During an interview with Antihero Magazine in November 2016, Sweet confirmed that he is recording another Sweet & Lynch album titled Unified which released November 2017. Since then, Sweet has gone on record stating Sweet & Lynch may have run its course citing Lynch's hands in many different projects has not allowed them to tour to promote the albums, the way Sweet would have liked, and he feels he has to do most of the promoting himself.

Sweet, as a member of Stryper, released God Damn Evil on April 20, 2018. Due to its album title, it was deemed offensive and garnered a "parental guidance" label and was banned from Walmart. Despite this controversy the album sold and charted well with most major music indexes. Perry Richardson did not perform on the album but toured in support of the album.

Sweet released his tenth studio album, Ten,  on RatPak Records in late 2019.

Sweet also participated as guitarist, lead singer and producer on Stryper's Even the Devil Believes that was released on September 4, 2020.

Personal life

Sweet met his wife Kyle while making Stryper's first video. They were married for 22 years and had two children together. In 2009, Kyle died after a two-year battle with cancer.

On January 8, 2010, Michael married Lisa Champagne.

Discography

Solo

Studio albums

Extended plays

Video albums

Guest appearances
1989: I 2 (EYE), Michael W. Smith (duet and background vocals on "All You're Missin' Is a Heartache")
1992: Free at Last, DC Talk (background vocals)
2004: Welcome to the Revolution, Liberty N' Justice (lead vocals on "Blind Man's Bluff")
2014: Onward to Freedom, Tourniquet (lead vocals & lead guitar on title song)

Notes

References

External links
 
 Synconation Speaks with Michael Sweet
 
 

1963 births
American Christians
American heavy metal guitarists
American heavy metal singers
American male singers
American performers of Christian music
Boston (band) members
Converts to Christianity
Living people
Musicians from Whittier, California
People from Cathedral City, California
Guitarists from California
Stryper members
20th-century American guitarists
American male guitarists
Restless Records artists